Karimnagar is a city and headquarters of the Karimnagar district in the state of Telangana.

Karimnagar may also refer to:

 Karimnagar district, a district in the state of Telangana 
 Karimnagar (Assembly constituency), constituency of Telangana Legislative Assembly, India
 Karimnagar (Lok Sabha constituency), one of the 17 Lok Sabha constituencies in Telangana

See also
 Karimnagar railway station, Telangana, India